Krasheninnikov may refer to:

 Pavel Krasheninnikov, Russian lawyer and politician
 Stepan Krasheninnikov, Russian explorer
 Yuri Krasheninnikov, Russian beach soccer player
 Krasheninnikov (volcano), two stratovolcanoes in Kamtchatka named for Stepan Krasheninnikov
 Krasheninnikov Peak, peak on the south side of the Svarthausane Crags in the Südliche Petermann Range of the Wohlthat Mountains, Antarctica.